In Jungian theory, the Cosmic Man is an archetypal figure that appears in creation myths of a wide variety of mythology. Generally, he is described as helpful or positive, and serves as a seed for the creation of the world. After death, parts of his body became physical parts of the universe. He also represents the oneness of human existence, or the universe.

Cosmic Man is a symbol of Self in the Jungian archetypes and is part of the goal of individuation for the individual and the collective. The process of individuation in cosmic man is often part of creation but can take place after death. The Cosmic Man archetype combines masculine and feminine or Anima and Animus and thus can be viewed as hermaphroditic or bisexual. Physical features include a primordial cosmic giant that goes through the process of individuation. The process can include dismemberment, plant or animal qualities, and a quaternary structure. Cosmic Man contains aspects of an archaic identity. Ideas and emotional values are part of a collective unconscious agreement, creating a primordial bond between elements, plants, animals, and humans. 

For example, in Chinese legend, Pangu is thought to have given the natural features of the Earth their form, and when he died his body became the Sacred Mountains of China. The Persian equivalent, Keyumars, released semen when he died, out of which came the first human couple. In Zoroastrian creation stories found in Persia, modern-day Iran, the primordial figure Gayōmart becomes earths metals and produces the first humans from Gold.

In Indian mythology, Purusha is a similar figure, who is considered the part of the individual which is immortal. Found in North East India, Kujum-Chantu is a female cosmic giant who remained still. Her body formed the earth and solar system upon death. 

In some Jewish legends, Adam was created from dust from the four corners of the Earth, and, when bent down, his head was the East and his feet the West. In another legend, he contained the soul of everybody who would ever be born. In the teachings of Kabbalah, such a primordial man is referred to as Adam Kadmon. In Mandaeism, the primordial man is known as Adam kasia, or "the hidden Adam." 

In the religious sciences of Islam, a more detailed explanation is furnished wherein the first Cosmic Man is identified as Adam. According to the sciences, Adam is a Cosmic Being because, apart from having an all-embracing power over the Universe, he also has the most privileged spiritual rank and status of a human being. 

The Cosmic Man corresponds within Islamic Sufi teachings with al-Insān al-Kāmil, meaning 'The Perfect Being", an honorific title often ascribed to Prophet Muhammad. The concept of al-Insān al-Kāmil was first coined and discussed by ibn Arabi. 

In many myths, the Cosmic Man is not just the beginning but also the final goal of life or creation. This is not necessarily a physical event, but may refer to the identification of the conscious ego with the self.

See also
 First man or woman (disambiguation)
 Protoplast (religion)
 Ymir
 Pangu
 Cipactli
 Purusha
 Tiamat

References

 von Franz, Marie-Louise. "The Process of Individuation." In Man and His Symbols, Carl Jung, ed. New York: Doubleday, 1964. Pages 200–204. 

Mythological archetypes
Jungian archetypes
Conceptions of God
Mythological first humans
Adam and Eve